Trouble in Paradise is a 1950 West German comedy film directed by Joe Stöckel and starring Olga Tschechowa, Trude Hesterberg and Trude Haefelin. It was shot at the Bavaria Studios in Munich and on location in Mittenwald and Grainau. The film's sets were designed by the art directors Rudolf Pfenninger and Max Seefelder.

Cast
 Olga Tschechowa as Myriam Esneh
 Trude Hesterberg as Ulrike Möller
 Trude Haefelin as Zenzi Pointner
 Elfie Pertramer as Kathi
 Olly Gubo as Iris Mehltreter
 Viktor Staal as Hans Soltau
 Joe Stöckel as Ignaz Pointner
 Beppo Brem as Wastl
 Rudolf Reiff as Hannibal Möller
 Heini Göbel as Stieglitz, gen. Leporello
 Walter Kiaulehn
 Willem Holsboer
 Ernst Rotmund as Preßburger
 Waldemar Frahm
 Alfred Pongratz as Bader-Simmerl
 Franz Fröhlich
 Franz Loskarn
 Ernst Schönle
 Hermann Goebel
 Hubert von Meyerinck

References

Bibliography
 Oliver Ohmann. Heinz Rühmann und "Die Feuerzangenbowle": die Geschichte eines Filmklassikers. Lehmstedt, 2010.

External links 
 

1950 films
1950 comedy films
German comedy films
West German films
1950s German-language films
Films directed by Joe Stöckel
German black-and-white films
1950s German films
Films shot at Bavaria Studios